Equestrian at the 1951 Pan American Games in Buenos Aires, Argentina.


Medal summary

Medal table

Events

References 
  .
 
 

1951
Equestrian
Pan American Games
1951 Pan American Games